The East German Athletics Championships was an annual outdoor track and field competition organised by the East German Athletics Federation, which served as the East German national championships for the sport. The three- or four-day event was held in summer months, varying from late June to early September, and the venue changed on an annual basis. The winners were exclusively East Germans.

It was first held in 1948 following the division of Germany, initially known as the Eastern Zone Athletics Championships for the first two years. The final edition was held in 1990, at which point it ended and was succeeded by the all-Germany German Athletics Championships.

Men

100 metres
1960: Klaus Schüler
1961: Hans Pollex
1962: Heinz Erbstößer
1963: Dietmar Falgowski
1964: Heinz Erbstößer
1965: Heinz Erbstößer
1966: Harald Eggers
1967: Harald Eggers
1968: Heinz Erbstößer
1969: Detlef Lewandowski
1970: Siegfried Schenke
1971: Siegfried Schenke
1972: Bernd Borth
1973: Hans-Jürgen Bombach
1974: Manfred Kokot
1975: Klaus-Dieter Kurrat
1976: Klaus-Dieter Kurrat
1977: Eugen Ray
1978: Eugen Ray
1979: Olaf Prenzler
1980: Eugen Ray
1981: Frank Emmelmann
1982: Frank Emmelmann
1983: Thomas Schröder
1984: Thomas Schröder
1985: Frank Emmelmann
1986: Thomas Schröder
1987: Steffen Bringmann
1988: Sven Matthes
1989: Steffen Bringmann
1990: Steffen Görmer

200 metres
1960: Helmuth Opitz
1961: Sigismund Kostulski
1962: Heinz Erbstößer
1963: Heinz Erbstößer
1964: Heinz Erbstößer
1965: Heinz Erbstößer
1966: Heinz Erbstößer
1967: Harald Eggers
1968: Hartmut Schelter
1969: Detlef Lewandowski
1970: Siegfried Schenke
1971: Jörg Pfeifer
1972: Siegfried Schenke
1973: Hans-Jürgen Bombach
1974: Hans-Jürgen Bombach
1975: Hans-Joachim Zenk
1976: Klaus-Dieter Kurrat
1977: Bernhard Hoff
1978: Olaf Prenzler
1979: Bernhard Hoff
1980: Bernhard Hoff
1981: Frank Emmelmann
1982: Detlef Kübeck
1983: Olaf Prenzler
1984: Frank Emmelmann
1985: Frank Emmelmann
1986: Thomas Schröder
1987: Frank Emmelmann
1988: Frank Emmelmann
1989: Steffen Schwabe
1990: Torsten Heimrath

400 metres
1960: Karl Storm
1961: Gottfried Klimbt
1962: Edgar Benkwitz
1963: Arthur Speer
1964: Arthur Speer
1965: Hartmut Schwabe
1966: Wilfried Weiland
1967: Wilfried Weiland
1968: Michael Zerbes
1969: Wolfgang Müller
1970: Wolfgang Müller
1971: Klaus Hauke
1972: Wolfgang Müller
1973: Andreas Scheibe
1974: Andreas Scheibe
1975: Dietmar Krug
1976: Günter Arnold
1977: Jürgen Utikal
1978: Frank Richter
1979: Frank Schaffer
1980: Frank Schaffer
1981: Andreas Knebel
1982: Andreas Knebel
1983: Thomas Schönlebe
1984: Thomas Schönlebe
1985: Thomas Schönlebe
1986: Mathias Schersing
1987: Thomas Schönlebe
1988: Thomas Schönlebe
1989: Matthias Schrober
1990: Jens Carlowitz

800 metres
1960: Manfred Matuschewski
1961: Manfred Matuschewski
1962: Manfred Matuschewski
1963: Manfred Matuschewski
1964: Manfred Matuschewski
1965: Manfred Matuschewski
1966: Manfred Matuschewski
1967: Rainer Fähse
1968: Dieter Fromm
1969: Manfred Matuschewski
1970: Ullrich Schmidt
1971: Dieter Fromm
1972: Dieter Fromm
1973: Hans-Henning Ohlert
1974: Hans-Henning Ohlert
1975: Dieter Fromm
1976: Olaf Beyer
1977: Olaf Beyer
1978: Detlef Wagenknecht
1979: Olaf Beyer
1980: Detlef Wagenknecht
1981: Olaf Beyer
1982: Detlef Wagenknecht
1983: Detlef Wagenknecht
1984: Detlef Wagenknecht
1985: Ralph Schumann
1986: Hans-Joachim Mogalle
1987: Jens-Peter Herold
1988: Ralph Schumann
1989: Jens-Peter Herold
1990: Ralph Schumann

1500 metres
1960: Siegfried Valentin
1961: Siegfried Valentin
1962: Jürgen May
1963: Karl-Heinz Kruse
1964: Siegfried Valentin
1965: Jürgen May
1966: Jürgen May
1967: Mathias Siedler
1968: Dieter Fromm
1969: Manfred Matuschewski
1970: Klaus-Peter Justus
1971: Bernd Exner
1972: Klaus-Peter Justus
1973: Klaus-Peter Justus
1974: Klaus-Peter Justus
1975: Klaus-Peter Justus
1976: Gerhard Stolle
1977: Jürgen Straub
1978: Jürgen Straub
1979: Jürgen Straub
1980: Jürgen Straub
1981: Olaf Beyer
1982: Olaf Beyer
1983: Andreas Busse
1984: Andreas Busse
1985: Olaf Beyer
1986: Andreas Busse
1987: Jens-Peter Herold
1988: Jens-Peter Herold
1989: Jens-Peter Herold
1990: Jens-Peter Herold

5000 metres
1960: Gerhard Hönicke
1961: Gerhard Hönicke
1962: Arthur Hannemann
1963: Friedrich Janke
1964: Siegfried Herrmann
1965: Siegfried Herrmann
1966: Siegfried Herrmann
1967: Gerd Eisenberg
1968: Bernd Dießner
1969: Jürgen Haase
1970: Gerd Eisenberg
1971: Bernd Dießner
1972: Frank Eisenberg
1973: Wilfried Scholz
1974: Manfred Kuschmann
1975: Manfred Kuschmann
1976: Jörg Peter
1977: Jörg Peter
1978: Jörg Peter
1979: Ralf Pönitzsch
1980: Jörg Peter
1981: Hansjörg Kunze
1982: Werner Schildhauer
1983: Hansjörg Kunze
1984: Hansjörg Kunze
1985: Werner Schildhauer
1986: Hansjörg Kunze
1987: Hansjörg Kunze
1988: Axel Krippschock
1989: Stephan Freigang
1990: Carsten Eich

10,000 metres
1960: Bruno Bartholome
1961: Friedrich Janke
1962: Friedrich Janke
1963: Friedrich Janke
1964: Siegfried Herrmann
1965: Jürgen Haase
1966: Jürgen Haase
1967: Paul Krebs
1968: Jürgen Haase
1969: Jürgen Busch
1970: Jürgen Haase
1971: Konstantin Popow
1972: Jürgen Haase
1973: Jürgen Haase
1974: Manfred Kuschmann
1975: Lutz Obschonka
1976: Lutz Obschonka
1977: Jörg Peter
1978: Karl-Heinz Leiteritz
1979: Waldemar Cierpinski
1980: Waldemar Cierpinski
1981: Werner Schildhauer
1982: Werner Schildhauer
1983: Werner Schildhauer
1984: Hansjörg Kunze
1985: Werner Schildhauer
1986: Hansjörg Kunze
1987: Hansjörg Kunze
1988: Hansjörg Kunze
1989: Hagen Melzer
1990: Carsten Eich

25K run
1962: Gerhard Hönicke
1963: Arthur Hannemann
1964: Klaus Böttger
1965: Gerhard Hönicke

Marathon
1960: Günter Havenstein
1961: Bruno Bartholome
1962: Gerhard Hönicke
1963: Heinrich Hagen
1964: Gerhard Hönicke
1965: Gerhard Hönicke
1966: Gerhard Lange
1967: Jürgen Busch
1968: Paul Krebs
1969: Steffen Gottert
1970: Joachim Truppel
1971: Jürgen Vesper
1972: Jürgen Busch
1973: Joachim Truppel
1974: Bernd Arnhold
1975: Joachim Truppel
1976: Karl-Heinz Baumbach
1977: Holger Runge
1978: Waldemar Cierpinski
1979: Joachim Truppel
1980: Martin Schröder
1981: Matthias Böckler
1982: Waldemar Cierpinski
1983: Stephan Seidemann
1984: Frank Konzack
1985: Jörg Peter
1986: Uwe Koch
1987: Michael Heilmann
1988: Rainer Wachenbrunner
1989: Steffen Dittmann
1990: Klaus Goldammer

3000 metres steeplechase
1960: Fred Döring
1961: Hermann Buhl
1962: Hermann Buhl
1963: Rainer Dörner
1964: Fred Döring
1965: Dieter Hartmann
1966: Dieter Hartmann
1967: Dieter Hermann
1968: Dieter Hermann
1969: Dieter Hermann
1970: Ulrich Holbeck
1971: Dieter Hermann
1972: Waldemar Cierpinski
1973: Jürgen Straub
1974: Jürgen Straub
1975: Jürgen Straub
1976: Ralf Pönitzsch
1977: Ralf Pönitzsch
1978: Gerhard Wetzig
1979: Ralf Pönitzsch
1980: Hagen Melzer
1981: Ralf Pönitzsch
1982: Rainer Wachenbrunner
1983: Hagen Melzer
1984: Rainer Wachenbrunner
1985: Hagen Melzer
1986: Hagen Melzer
1987: Hagen Melzer
1988: Hagen Melzer
1989: Hagen Melzer
1990: Uwe Pflügner

110 metres hurdles
1960: Hans Reimers
1961: Herbert Widera
1962: Hans-Werner Regenbrecht
1963: Hans-Werner Regenbrecht
1964: Christian Voigt
1965: Christian Voigt
1966: Richard Stotz
1967: Richard Stotz
1968: Richard Stotz
1969: Raimund Bethge
1970: Frank Siebeck
1971: Frank Siebeck
1972: Frank Siebeck
1973: Frank Siebeck
1974: Frank Siebeck
1975: Thomas Munkelt
1976: Thomas Munkelt
1977: Thomas Munkelt
1978: Thomas Munkelt
1979: Thomas Munkelt
1980: Thomas Munkelt
1981: Andreas Schlißke
1982: Thomas Munkelt
1983: Thomas Munkelt
1984: Thomas Munkelt
1985: Oliver Grawe
1986: Holger Pohland
1987: Andreas Oschkenat
1988: Holger Pohland
1989: Holger Pohland
1990: Holger Pohland

200 metres hurdles
1961: Herbert Widera
1962: Joachim Singer
1963: W. Skarus
1964: Joachim Singer
1965: G. Schenk

400 metres hurdles
1960: Christian Hille
1961: Herbert Widera
1962: Joachim Singer
1963: Joachim Singer
1964: Joachim Singer
1965: Werner Schiedewitz
1966: Joachim Singer
1967: Bernd Hopfer
1968: Lutz Waldner
1969: Christian Rudolph
1970: Christian Rudolph
1971: Christian Rudolph
1972: Christian Rudolph
1973: Jürgen Laser
1974: Klaus Schönberger
1975: Jochen Mayer
1976: Jochen Mayer
1977: Klaus Schönberger
1978: Manfred Konow
1979: Manfred Konow
1980: Volker Beck
1981: Volker Beck
1982: Uwe Ackermann
1983: Volker Beck
1984: Manfred Konow
1985: Hans-Jürgen Ende
1986: Ingo Krüger
1987: Uwe Ackermann
1988: Uwe Ackermann
1989: Hans-Jürgen Ende
1990: Daniel Blochwitz

High jump
1960: Werner Pfeil
1961: Gerd Dührkop
1962: Gerd Dührkop
1963: Gerd Dührkop
1964: Werner Pfeil
1965: Waldemar Schütz
1966: Werner Pfeil
1967: Rudi Köppen
1968: Rudi Köppen
1969: Herbert Hüttl
1970: Herbert Hüttl
1971: Gerd Dührkop
1972: Stefan Junge
1973: Stefan Junge
1974: Rolf Beilschmidt
1975: Rolf Beilschmidt
1976: Rolf Beilschmidt
1977: Rolf Beilschmidt
1978: Rolf Beilschmidt
1979: Rolf Beilschmidt
1980: Gerd Wessig
1981: Rolf Beilschmidt
1982: Jörg Freimuth
1983: Andreas Sam
1984: Gerd Wessig
1985: Gerd Wessig
1986: Gerd Wessig
1987: Matthias Grebenstein
1988: Gerd Wessig
1989: Gerd Wessig
1990: Uwe Bellmann

Pole vault
1960: Manfred Preußger
1961: Peter Laufer
1962: Manfred Preußger
1963: Manfred Preußger
1964: Manfred Preußger
1965: Wolfgang Nordwig
1966: Wolfgang Nordwig
1967: Wolfgang Nordwig
1968: Wolfgang Nordwig
1969: Wolfgang Nordwig
1970: Wolfgang Nordwig
1971: Wolfgang Nordwig
1972: Wolfgang Nordwig
1973: Manfred Frühauf
1974: Wolfgang Reinhardt
1975: Peter Wienick
1976: Axel Weber
1977: Axel Weber
1978: Wolfgang Reinhardt
1979: Axel Weber
1980: Axel Weber
1981: Axel Weber
1982: Steffen Giebe
1983: Olaf Kasten
1984: Andreas Kramss
1985: Christoph Pietz
1986: Uwe Langhammer
1987: Uwe Langhammer
1988: Uwe Langhammer
1989: Uwe Langhammer
1990: Uwe Langhammer

Long jump
1960: Karl Thierfelder
1961: Klaus Beer
1962: Klaus Beer
1963: Arndt Kluge
1964: Klaus Beer
1965: Udo Vogel
1966: Udo Vogel
1967: Klaus Beer
1968: Klaus Beer
1969: Klaus Beer
1970: Klaus Beer
1971: Max Klauß
1972: Max Klauß
1973: Max Klauß
1974: Max Klauß
1975: Peter Rieger
1976: Frank Wartenberg
1977: Erwin Plöger
1978: Frank Paschek
1979: Lutz Dombrowski
1980: Frank Paschek
1981: Uwe Lange
1982: Uwe Lange
1983: Frank Nowak
1984: Lutz Dombrowski
1985: Uwe Lange
1986: Ron Beer
1987: Marco Delonge
1988: Ron Beer
1989: Marco Delonge
1990: André Müller

Triple jump
1960: Karl Thierfelder
1961: Hans-Jürgen Rückborn
1962: Manfred Hinze
1963: Hans-Jürgen Rückborn
1964: Klaus Neumann
1965: Hans-Jürgen Rückborn
1966: Siegfried Dähne
1967: Hans-Jürgen Rückborn
1968: Heinz-Günter Schenk
1969: Jörg Drehmel
1970: Jörg Drehmel
1971: Jörg Drehmel
1972: Jörg Drehmel
1973: Heinz-Günter Schenk
1974: Jörg Drehmel
1975: Hans-Dieter Haberland
1976: Klaus Hufnagel
1977: Klaus Hufnagel
1978: Lothar Gora
1979: Klaus Hufnagel
1980: Klaus Hufnagel
1981: Matthias Schröder
1982: Heiko Fermumm
1983: Axel Gross
1984: Volker Mai
1985: Dirk Gamlin
1986: Dirk Gamlin
1987: Jörg Friess
1988: Volker Mai
1989: Dirk Gamlin
1990: Jörg Friess

Shot put
1960: Peter Gratz
1961: Rudolf Langer
1962: Peter Gratz
1963: Rudolf Langer
1964: Rudolf Langer
1965: Uwe Grabe
1966: Rudolf Langer
1967: Dieter Prollius
1968: Dieter Hoffmann
1969: Hans-Peter Gies
1970: Hartmut Briesenick
1971: Hartmut Briesenick
1972: Hans-Peter Gies
1973: Hartmut Briesenick
1974: Hartmut Briesenick
1975: Heinz-Joachim Rothenburg
1976: Hans-Peter Gies
1977: Udo Beyer
1978: Udo Beyer
1979: Udo Beyer
1980: Udo Beyer
1981: Udo Beyer
1982: Udo Beyer
1983: Udo Beyer
1984: Udo Beyer
1985: Udo Beyer
1986: Udo Beyer
1987: Udo Beyer
1988: Ulf Timmermann
1989: Ulf Timmermann
1990: Ulf Timmermann

Discus throw
1960: Fritz Kühl
1961: Lothar Milde
1962: Lothar Milde
1963: Lothar Milde
1964: Fritz Kühl
1965: Fritz Kühl
1966: Hartmut Losch
1967: Detlef Thorith
1968: Lothar Milde
1969: Lothar Milde
1970: Detlef Thorith
1971: Lothar Milde
1972: Detlef Thorith
1973: Siegfried Pachale
1974: Gunnar Müller
1975: Wolfgang Schmidt
1976: Wolfgang Schmidt
1977: Wolfgang Schmidt
1978: Wolfgang Schmidt
1979: Wolfgang Schmidt
1980: Wolfgang Schmidt
1981: Armin Lemme
1982: Armin Lemme
1983: Jürgen Schult
1984: Jürgen Schult
1985: Jürgen Schult
1986: Jürgen Schult
1987: Jürgen Schult
1988: Jürgen Schult
1989: Jürgen Schult
1990: Jürgen Schult

Hammer throw
1960: Klaus Peter
1961: Horst Niebisch
1962: Martin Lotz
1963: Martin Lotz
1964: Manfred Losch
1965: Martin Lotz
1966: Manfred Losch
1967: Manfred Losch
1968: Reinhard Theimer
1969: Reinhard Theimer
1970: Reinhard Theimer
1971: Jochen Sachse
1972: Jochen Sachse
1973: Reinhard Theimer
1974: Reinhard Theimer
1975: Jochen Sachse
1976: Jochen Sachse
1977: Karl-Heinz Beilig
1978: Roland Steuk
1979: Roland Steuk
1980: Roland Steuk
1981: Roland Steuk
1982: Roland Steuk
1983: Roland Steuk
1984: Ralf Haber
1985: Matthias Moder
1986: Günther Rodehau
1987: Ralf Haber
1988: Ralf Haber
1989: Ralf Haber
1990: Günther Rodehau

Javelin throw
1960: Walter Krüger
1961: Erich Ahrendt
1962: Wolfgang Frommhagen
1963: Horst Bade
1964: Horst Bade
1965: Manfred Stolle
1966: Horst Bade
1967: Manfred Stolle
1968: Manfred Stolle
1969: Manfred Stolle
1970: Manfred Stolle
1971: Manfred Stolle
1972: Manfred Stolle
1973: Manfred Stolle
1974: Manfred Ahlert
1975: Detlef Michel
1976: Wolfgang Hanisch
1977: Wolfgang Hanisch
1978: Wolfgang Hanisch
1979: Detlef Michel
1980: Detlef Michel
1981: Gerald Weiß
1982: Detlef Michel
1983: Detlef Michel
1984: Uwe Hohn
1985: Uwe Hohn
1986: Detlef Michel
1987: Detlef Michel
1988: Silvio Warsönke
1989: Volker Hadwich
1990: Raymond Hecht

Decathlon
1960: Wolfgang Utech
1961: Wolfgang Utech
1962: Gerhard Lohse
1963: Wolfgang Utech
1964: Wolfgang Utech
1965: Horst Mempel
1966: Rudolf Langer
1967: Max Klauß
1968: Herbert Wessel
1969: Rüdiger Demmig
1970: Rüdiger Demmig
1971: Herbert Wessel
1972: Stefan Schreyer
1973: Dieter Krüger
1974: Rainer Pottel
1975: Dieter Krüger
1976: Siegfried Stark
1977: Siegfried Stark
1978: Rainer Pottel
1979: Steffen Grumbt
1980: Dietmar Jentsch
1981: Rainer Pottel
1982: Torsten Voss
1983: Torsten Voss
1984: Uwe Freimuth
1985: Uwe Freimuth
1986: Uwe Freimuth
1987: Torsten Voss
1988: Uwe Freimuth
1989: René Günther
1990: Torsten Voss

10,000 metres walk
1987: Axel Noack

20 kilometres walk
The event was held on a track from 1970 to 1972 and in 1990
1960: Hans-Joachim Pathus
1961: Hans-Joachim Pathus
1962: Hans-Georg Reimann
1963: Hans-Joachim Pathus
1964: Hans-Georg Reimann
1965: Hans-Joachim Pathus
1966: Gerhard Sperling
1967: Hans-Georg Reimann
1968: Gerhard Sperling
1969: Gerhard Sperling
1970: Peter Frenkel
1971: Gerhard Sperling
1972: Peter Frenkel & Hans-Georg Reimann
1973: Karl-Heinz Stadtmüller
1974: Karl-Heinz Stadtmüller
1975: Hartwig Gauder
1976: Hartwig Gauder
1977: Werner Heyer
1978: Roland Wieser
1979: Fred Sparmann
1980: Karl-Heinz Stadtmüller
1981: Ralf Kowalsky
1982: Werner Heyer
1983: Ralf Kowalsky
1984: Ronald Weigel
1985: Hartwig Gauder
1986: Hartwig Gauder
1987: Axel Noack
1988: Ronald Weigel
1989: Ronald Weigel
1990: Axel Noack

35 kilometres walk
1963: Burkhard Leuschke
1964: Christoph Höhne
1965: Christoph Höhne

50 kilometres walk
1960: Max Weber
1961: Hannes Koch
1962: Helmut Wilke
1963: Christoph Höhne
1964: Christoph Höhne
1965: Christoph Höhne
1966: Peter Selzer
1967: Peter Selzer
1968: Christoph Höhne
1969: Christoph Höhne
1970: Christoph Höhne
1971: Christoph Höhne
1972: Karl-Heinz Stadtmüller
1973: Peter Selzer
1974: Winfried Skotnicki
1975: Olaf Pilarski
1976: Steffen Müller
1977: Ralf Knütter
1978: Karl-Heinz Stadtmüller
1979: Hartwig Gauder
1980: Hans-Jürgen Lange
1981: Uwe Dünkel
1982: Hartwig Gauder
1983: Ronald Weigel
1984: Axel Noack
1985: Ronald Weigel
1986: Hartwig Gauder
1987: Dietmar Meisch
1988: Ronald Weigel
1989: Bernd Gummelt

Cross country (long course)
From 1960 to 1974 the event was held in December of the previous year, but the winners were classed as the champion for the subsequent year.
1960: Hans Grodotzki
1961: Gerhard Hönicke
1962: Not held
1963: Friedrich Janke
1964: Siegfried Herrmann
1965: Klaus Böttger
1966: Siegfried Herrmann
1967: Jürgen Haase
1968: Jürgen Haase
1969: Jürgen Haase
1970: Stefan Künzel
1971: Manfred Kuschmann
1972: Jürgen Haase
1973: Ronald Schwert
1974: Karl-Heinz Leiteritz
1975: Frank Baumgartl
1976: Wilfried Scholz
1977: Hans-Henning Bräutigam
1978: Hans-Henning Bräutigam
1979: Lutz Obschonka
1980: Ralf Pönitzsch
1981: Werner Schildhauer
1982: Hansjörg Kunze
1983: Werner Schildhauer
1984: Werner Schildhauer
1985: Frank Heine
1986: Frank Heine
1987: Frank Heine
1988: Rainer Wachenbrunner
1989: Steffen Dittmann
1990: Rainer Wachenbrunner

Cross country (short course)
From 1960 to 1974 the event was held in December of the previous year, but were classed as the champion for the subsequent year.
1960: Siegfried Herrmann
1961: Siegfried Herrmann
1962: Not held
1963: Jürgen May
1964: Jürgen May
1965: Jürgen May
1966: Wolf-Dieter Holtz
1967: Dieter Hermann
1968: Bernd Dreke
1969: Frank Eisenberg
1970: Bernd Dießner
1971: Klaus-Peter Justus
1972: Jürgen Hemmerling
1973: Andreas/Horst? Lohmann
1974: Klaus-Dieter Schieminz
1975: Siegfried Arndt
1976: Olaf Beyer
1977: Helfried Tannert
1978: Werner Schildhauer
1979: Johannes Ehmcke
1980: Frank Baumgartl
1981: Lutz Zauber
1982: Olaf Beyer
1983: Lutz Zauber
1984: Olaf Beyer
1985: Olaf Beyer
1986: Steffen Matthes
1987: André Wessel
1988: Olaf Beyer
1989: Heiner Mebes
1990: Thomas Margott

Women

100 metres
1960: Gisela Birkemeyer
1961: Hannelore Räpke
1962: Hannelore Räpke
1963: Hannelore Räpke
1964: Heilwig Jakob
1965: Gundula Diel
1966: Ingrid Tiedtke
1967: Renate Heldt
1968: Angela Vogel
1969: Petra Kandarr
1970: Renate Stecher
1971: Renate Stecher
1972: Evelin Kaufer
1973: Renate Stecher
1974: Renate Stecher
1975: Renate Stecher
1976: Monika Hamann
1977: Marlies Göhr
1978: Marlies Göhr
1979: Marlies Göhr
1980: Marlies Göhr
1981: Marlies Göhr
1982: Marlies Göhr
1983: Marlies Göhr
1984: Marlies Göhr
1985: Marlies Göhr
1986: Silke Möller
1987: Silke Möller
1988: Marlies Göhr
1989: Katrin Krabbe
1990: Kerstin Behrendt

200 metres
1960: Gisela Birkemeyer
1961: Hannelore Räpke
1962: Hannelore Räpke
1963: Hannelore Räpke
1964: Hannelore Räpke
1965: Gundula Diel
1966: Ingrid Tiedtke
1967: Ingrid Tiedtke
1968: Karin Balzer
1969: Petra Kandarr
1970: Renate Stecher
1971: Renate Stecher
1972: Christine Heinich
1973: Renate Stecher
1974: Renate Stecher
1975: Carla Bodendorf
1976: Bärbel Wöckel
1977: Bärbel Wöckel
1978: Marlies Göhr
1979: Marita Koch
1980: Bärbel Wöckel
1981: Bärbel Wöckel
1982: Marita Koch
1983: Marita Koch
1984: Marlies Göhr
1985: Marita Koch
1986: Heike Drechsler
1987: Silke Möller
1988: Heike Drechsler
1989: Silke Möller
1990: Katrin Krabbe

400 metres
1960: Crista Wessler
1961: Bärbel Mayer
1962: Barbara Reinnagel
1963: Gertrude Schmidt
1964: Gertrude Schmidt
1965: Gertrude Schmidt
1966: Brigitte Flach
1967: Ingrid Zander
1968: Waltraud Dietsch
1969: Hannelore Middecke
1970: Monika Zehrt
1971: Helga Seidler
1972: Monika Zehrt
1973: Monika Zehrt
1974: Ellen Streidt
1975: Brigitte Rohde
1976: Brigitte Rohde
1977: Marita Koch
1978: Marita Koch
1979: Christina Lathan & Gabriele Löwe
1980: Marita Koch
1981: Marita Koch
1982: Dagmar Neubauer
1983: Sabine Busch
1984: Marita Koch
1985: Kirsten Emmelmann
1986: Petra Schersing
1987: Petra Schersing
1988: Petra Schersing
1989: Grit Breuer
1990: Grit Breuer

800 metres
1960: Ursula Donath
1961: Ilse Schönemann
1962: Waltraud Strotzer
1963: Waltraud Strotzer
1964: Waltraud Strotzer
1965: Hannelore Suppe
1966: Waltraud Strotzer
1967: Regine Kleinau
1968: Karin Krebs
1969: Barbara Wieck
1970: Gunhild Hoffmeister
1971: Gunhild Hoffmeister
1972: Gunhild Hoffmeister
1973: Gunhild Hoffmeister
1974: Gunhild Hoffmeister
1975: Christina Neumann
1976: Gunhild Hoffmeister
1977: Christina Liebetrau
1978: Anita Weiß
1979: Anita Weiß
1980: Hildegard Körner
1981: Martina Steuk
1982: Martina Steuk
1983: Christine Wachtel
1984: Hildegard Körner
1985: Christine Wachtel
1986: Sigrun Wodars
1987: Christine Wachtel
1988: Christine Wachtel
1989: Sigrun Wodars
1990: Sigrun Wodars

1500 metres
1967: Waltraud Strotzer
1968: Gunhild Hoffmeister
1969: Gunhild Hoffmeister
1970: Gunhild Hoffmeister
1971: Gunhild Hoffmeister
1972: Gunhild Hoffmeister
1973: Gunhild Hoffmeister
1974: Gunhild Hoffmeister
1975: Waltraud Strotzer
1976: Gunhild Hoffmeister
1977: Christina Liebetrau
1978: Ulrike Bruns
1979: Christiane Wartenberg
1980: Christiane Wartenberg
1981: Angelika Zauber
1982: Ulrike Bruns
1983: Christiane Wartenberg
1984: Ulrike Bruns
1985: Ulrike Bruns
1986: Ines Bibernell
1987: Hildegard Körner
1988: Birgit Barth
1989: Ellen Kiessling
1990: Ellen Kiessling

3000 metres
1976: Ulrike Bruns
1977: Gabriele Meinel
1978: Gabriele Meinel
1979: Petra Sabban
1980: Katrin Dörre-Heinig
1981: Ulrike Bruns
1982: Ulrike Bruns
1983: Gabriele Meinel
1984: Ulrike Bruns
1985: Ines Bibernell
1986: Ines Bibernell
1987: Kathrin Weßel
1988: Kathrin Weßel
1989: Kathrin Weßel
1990: Kathrin Weßel

10,000 metres
1985: Ines Bibernell
1986: Ulrike Bruns
1987: Kathrin Weßel
1988: Kathrin Weßel
1989: Kathrin Weßel
1990: Kathrin Weßel

Marathon
1982: Katrin Dörre-Heinig
1983: Gabriele Meinel
1984: Ute Möckel
1985: Birgit Weinhold
1986: Uta Pippig
1987: Uta Pippig
1988: Andrea Fleischer
1989: Annette Fincke
1990: Andrea Fleischer

3000 metres steeplechase

80 metres hurdles
1960: Gisela Birkemeyer
1961: Gisela Birkemeyer
1962: Karin Balzer
1963: Karin Balzer
1964: Gundula Diel
1965: Gundula Diel
1966: Karin Balzer
1967: Karin Balzer
1968: Karin Balzer

100 metres hurdles
1967: Inge Köppen
1968: Petra Gloger
1969: Karin Balzer
1970: Annelie Jahns
1971: Karin Balzer
1972: Annelie Ehrhardt
1973: Annelie Ehrhardt
1974: Annelie Ehrhardt
1975: Annerose Fiedler
1976: Johanna Klier
1977: Johanna Klier
1978: Johanna Klier
1979: Kerstin Knabe
1980: Johanna Klier
1981: Kerstin Knabe
1982: Bettine Jahn
1983: Bettine Jahn
1984: Cornelia Oschkenat
1985: Cornelia Oschkenat
1986: Cornelia Oschkenat
1987: Gloria Siebert
1988: Cornelia Oschkenat
1989: Cornelia Oschkenat
1990: Gloria Siebert

200 metres hurdles
1970: Annelie Jahns

400 metres hurdles
In 1977 a women's 400 m hurdles was held, but did not yet have official championship status.
1977: Karin Roßley
1978: Anita Weiß
1979: Bärbel Broschat
1980: Petra Pfaff
1981: Ellen Fiedler
1982: Ellen Fiedler
1983: Ellen Fiedler
1984: Birgit Uibel
1985: Sabine Busch
1986: Sabine Busch
1987: Sabine Busch
1988: Sabine Busch
1989: Petra Krug
1990: Heike Meißner

High jump
1960: Doris Langer
1961: Renate Feige
1962: Doris Langer
1963: Doris Langer
1964: Gerda Kupferschmidt
1965: Rita Gildemeister
1966: Bärbel Graf
1967: Rita Kirst
1968: Rita Kirst
1969: Rita Kirst
1970: Rita Kirst
1971: Rita Kirst
1972: Rita Kirst
1973: Rosemarie Ackermann
1974: Rosemarie Ackermann
1975: Rita Kirst
1976: Rosemarie Ackermann
1977: Rosemarie Ackermann
1978: Jutta Kirst
1979: Rosemarie Ackermann
1980: Rosemarie Ackermann
1981: Andrea Reichstein
1982: Andrea Reichstein
1983: Susanne Beyer
1984: Andrea Reichstein
1985: Susanne Beyer
1986: Andrea Reichstein
1987: Susanne Beyer
1988: Gabriele Günz
1989: Heike Balck
1990: Heike Balck

Long jump
1960: Hildrun Laufer-Claus
1961: Hildrun Laufer-Claus
1962: Hildrun Laufer-Claus
1963: Karin Balzer
1964: Hildrun Laufer
1965: Inge Bauer
1966: Burghild Wieczorek
1967: Bärbel Löhnert
1968: Bärbel Löhnert
1969: Kristina Hauer
1970: Margrit Olfert
1971: Margrit Olfert
1972: Angelika Liebsch
1973: Angela Voigt
1974: Marianne Voelzke
1975: Angela Voigt
1976: Angela Voigt
1977: Brigitte Wujak
1978: Angela Voigt
1979: Angela Voigt
1980: Siegrun Siegl
1981: Heike Drechsler
1982: Ramona Neubert
1983: Heike Drechsler
1984: Heike Drechsler
1985: Heike Drechsler
1986: Heike Drechsler
1987: Heike Drechsler
1988: Heike Drechsler
1989: Helga Radtke
1990: Heike Drechsler

Shot put
1960: Johanna Lüttge
1961: Renate Boy
1962: Renate Boy
1963: Renate Boy
1964: Renate Boy
1965: Renate Boy
1966: Margitta Gummel
1967: Renate Boy
1968: Margitta Gummel
1969: Margitta Gummel
1970: Marita Lange
1971: Margitta Gummel
1972: Margitta Gummel
1973: Marita Lange
1974: Marianne Adam
1975: Marianne Adam
1976: Marianne Adam
1977: Ilona Slupianek
1978: Margitta Pufe
1979: Ilona Slupianek
1980: Ilona Slupianek
1981: Ilona Slupianek
1982: Ilona Slupianek
1983: Ilona Slupianek
1984: Ilona Slupianek
1985: Ines Müller
1986: Ines Müller
1987: Heike Hartwig
1988: Kathrin Neimke
1989: Heike Hartwig
1990: Heike Hartwig

Discus throw
1960: Doris Lorenz-Müller
1961: Doris Lorenz-Müller
1962: Ingrid Lotz
1963: Ingrid Lotz
1964: Ingrid Lotz
1965: Anita Otto
1966: Anita Otto
1967: Karin Illgen
1968: Karin Illgen
1969: Gabriele Hinzmann
1970: Anna Mickler
1971: Karin Illgen
1972: Gabriele Hinzmann
1973: Gabriele Hinzmann
1974: Gabriele Hinzmann
1975: Sabine Engel
1976: Evelin Jahl
1977: Evelin Jahl
1978: Evelin Jahl
1979: Evelin Jahl
1980: Evelin Jahl
1981: Evelin Jahl
1982: Irina Meszynski
1983: Gisela Beyer
1984: Gisela Beyer
1985: Martina Hellmann
1986: Martina Hellmann
1987: Martina Hellmann
1988: Diana Gansky
1989: Ilke Wyludda
1990: Ilke Wyludda

Javelin throw
1960: Crista Ranke
1961: Crista Ranke
1962: Marion Lüttge
1963: Marion Lüttge
1964: Inga Schwalbe
1965: Helga Schulze
1966: Marion Lüttge
1967: Ruth Fuchs
1968: Helga Schulze
1969: Helga Börner
1970: Ruth Fuchs
1971: Ruth Fuchs
1972: Ruth Fuchs
1973: Ruth Fuchs
1974: Jacqueline Todten
1975: Ruth Fuchs
1976: Ruth Fuchs
1977: Ruth Fuchs
1978: Ruth Fuchs
1979: Ruth Fuchs
1980: Ruth Fuchs
1981: Rositha Potreck
1982: Ute Richter
1983: Antje Zöllkau
1984: Petra Felke
1985: Petra Felke
1986: Petra Felke
1987: Petra Felke
1988: Petra Felke
1989: Petra Felke
1990: Karen Forkel

Pentathlon
1960: Christa Gutsche
1961: Christa Gutsche
1962: Karin Balzer
1963: Karin Balzer
1964: Inge Bauer
1965: Inge Bauer
1966: Gerda Uhlemann
1967: Bärbel Löhnert
1968: Bärbel Löhnert
1969: Burglinde Pollak
1970: Burglinde Pollak
1971: Margrit Olfert
1972: Christine Bodner
1973: Burglinde Pollak
1974: Burglinde Pollak
1975: Siegrun Siegl
1976: Petra Rampf
1977: Petra Rampf
1978: Petra Steinbrück
1979: Burglinde Pollak

Heptathlon
1980: Anke Behmer
1981: Ramona Neubert
1982: Anke Behmer
1983: Anke Behmer
1984: Sabine John
1985: Sibylle Thiele
1986: Anke Behmer
1987: Anke Behmer
1988: Heike Tischler
1989: Birgit Gautzsch
1990: Heike Tischler

3000 metres walk
1984: Doris Kampa

5000 metres walk
1990: Beate Gummelt

10 kilometres walk
1985: Ula Klaedtke
1986: Ines Estedt
1987: Beate Gummelt
1988: Beate Gummelt
1989: Beate Gummelt

Cross country (long course)
1986: Gabriele Meinel
1987: Kathrin Weßel
1988: Kristina Garlipp
1989: Kathrin Weßel
1990: Kathrin Weßel∂

Cross country (short course)
From 1960 to 1974 the event was held in December of the previous year, but the winners were classed as the champion for the subsequent year.
1960: Ursula Donath
1961: Gisela Breier
1962: Not held
1963: Annemarie Hübner
1964: Annemarie Hübner
1965: Annemarie Hübner
1966: Irene Hansen
1967: Waltraud Strotzer
1968: Karin Krebs
1969: Gertrude Schmidt
1970: Katharina Clausnitzer
1971: Gunhild Hoffmeister
1972: Iris Claus
1973: Heidrun Schröder
1974: Waltraud Strotzer
1975: Katja Hermann
1976: Ulrike Bruns
1977: Ulrike Bruns
1978: Gabriele Meinel
1979: Ulla Sauer
1980: Anita Weiß
1981: Ulrike Bruns
1982: Beate Liebich
1983: Gabriele Meinel
1984: Ulrike Bruns
1985: Jeanette Hain
1986: Yvonne Grabner
1987: Sabine Leist
1988: Andrea Fleischer
1989: Katrin Kowalski
1990: Hildegard Körner

References

Champions 1960–1990
East German Championships. GBR Athletics. Retrieved 2021-01-28.

Winners
 List
East German Championships
Athletics